The 2011 NHL Entry Draft was the 49th NHL Entry Draft. It was held on June 24–25, 2011, at the Xcel Energy Center in Saint Paul, Minnesota. It was the first time the Draft was held in the state of Minnesota since the Minnesota North Stars hosted the 1989 NHL Entry Draft.
The top three picks consisted of Ryan Nugent-Hopkins going to the Edmonton Oilers, Gabriel Landeskog going to the Colorado Avalanche, and Jonathan Huberdeau going to the Florida Panthers.

The draft was also noteworthy as the venue at which the recently relocated Atlanta Thrashers franchise announced that they would be known as the Winnipeg Jets, making the announcement as they drafted Mark Scheifele with their first pick.

Eligibility 

Ice hockey players born between January 1, 1991, and September 15, 1993, were eligible for selection in the 2011 NHL Entry Draft. Additionally, un-drafted, non-North American players over the age of 20 were eligible for the draft; and those players who were drafted in the 2009 NHL Entry Draft, but not signed by an NHL team and who were born after June 24, 1991, were also eligible to re-enter the draft.

Draft lottery
The draft lottery was held on April 12, 2011, and was won by the New Jersey Devils, who moved up four spots to the fourth-overall pick. The Edmonton Oilers retained the first-overall pick. This was the first time since the 2007 draft lottery that a team other than the team with the worst regular season record won the draft lottery. New Jersey were also tied with the 1999 Chicago Blackhawks for the lowest ranked team to win the lottery as the eighth seed.

Top prospects 
Source: NHL Central Scouting Bureau final ranking.

Source: International Scouting Services May 2011 ranking.

Selections by round

Round one

Notes
 The Columbus Blue Jackets' first-round pick went to the Philadelphia Flyers as the result of a trade on June 23, 2011, that sent Jeff Carter to Columbus in exchange for Jakub Voracek, a third-round pick in 2011 and this pick.
 The Toronto Maple Leafs' first-round pick went to the Boston Bruins as the result of a trade on September 18, 2009, that sent Phil Kessel to Toronto in exchange for a first-round pick in 2010, a second-round pick in 2010 and this pick.
 The St. Louis Blues' first-round pick went to the Colorado Avalanche as the result of a trade on February 19, 2011, that sent Kevin Shattenkirk, Chris Stewart and a conditional second-round pick to the Blues in exchange for Erik Johnson, Jay McClement and this pick (being conditional at the time of the trade). The condition – St. Louis' pick was not among the top 10 picks – was converted on April 12, 2011, when St. Louis retained the 11th overall pick at the NHL Draft Lottery.
 The Los Angeles Kings' first-round pick went to the Edmonton Oilers as the result of a trade on February 28, 2011, that sent Dustin Penner to Los Angeles in exchange for Colten Teubert, a conditional third-round pick in 2012 and this pick.
 The Nashville Predators' first-round pick went to the Ottawa Senators as the result of a trade on February 10, 2011, that sent Mike Fisher to Nashville in exchange for a conditional pick in 2012 and this pick.
 The Anaheim Ducks' first-round pick went to the Toronto Maple Leafs as the result of a trade on June 24, 2011, that sent Boston's first-round pick in 2011 (30th overall) and Toronto's second-round pick in 2011 (39th overall) to Anaheim in exchange for this pick.
 The Detroit Red Wings' first-round pick went to the Ottawa Senators as the result of a trade on June 24, 2011, that sent Ottawa and Chicago's second-round picks in 2011 (35th and 48th overall) to Detroit in exchange for this pick.
 The Philadelphia Flyers' first-round pick went to the Toronto Maple Leafs as the result of a trade on February 14, 2011, that sent Kris Versteeg to Philadelphia in exchange for a third-round pick in 2011 and this pick.
 The Washington Capitals' first-round pick went to the Chicago Blackhawks as the result of a trade on June 24, 2011, that sent Troy Brouwer to Washington in exchange for this pick.
 The San Jose Sharks' first-round pick went to the Minnesota Wild as the result of a trade on June 24, 2011, that sent Brent Burns and a second-round pick in 2012 to San Jose in exchange for Devin Setoguchi, Charlie Coyle and this pick.
 The Boston Bruins' first-round pick went to the Anaheim Ducks as the result of a trade on June 24, 2011, that sent Anaheim's first-round pick in 2011 (22nd overall) to Toronto in exchange for the Maple Leafs' second-round pick in 2011 (39th overall) and this pick.
Toronto previously acquired the pick in a trade on February 18, 2011, that sent Tomas Kaberle to Boston in exchange for Joe Colborne, a conditional second-round pick in 2012 and this pick.

Round two

Notes
 The Colorado Avalanche's second-round pick went to the St. Louis Blues as the result of a trade on February 19, 2011, that sent Erik Johnson, Jay McClement and a conditional first-round pick to Colorado in exchange for Kevin Shattenkirk, Chris Stewart and this pick (being conditional at the time of the trade). The condition – St. Louis' pick was not among the top 10 picks – was converted on April 12, 2011, when St. Louis retained the 11th overall pick at the NHL Draft Lottery.
 The Ottawa Senators' second-round pick went to the Detroit Red Wings as the result of a trade on June 24, 2011, that sent a first-round pick in 2011 (24th overall) to Ottawa in exchange for Chicago's second-round pick in 2011 (#48 overall) and this pick.
 The Winnipeg Jets' second-round pick went to the Chicago Blackhawks as the result of a trade on July 1, 2010, that sent Andrew Ladd to the Atlanta Thrashers in exchange for Ivan Vishnevskiy and this pick.
 The New Jersey Devils' second-round pick went to the Nashville Predators as the result of a trade on June 19, 2010, that sent Jason Arnott to New Jersey in exchange for Matthew Halischuk and this pick.
 The Toronto Maple Leafs' second-round pick went to the Anaheim Ducks as the result of a trade on June 24, 2011, that sent Anaheim's first-round pick in 2011 (22nd overall) to Toronto in exchange for Boston's first-round pick in 2011 (30th overall) and this pick.
 The Minnesota Wild's second-round pick went to the Boston Bruins as the result of a trade on October 18, 2009, that sent Chuck Kobasew to Minnesota in exchange for Craig Weller, Alexander Fallstrom and this pick.
 The Calgary Flames' second-round pick went to the Chicago Blackhawks as the result of a trade on September 5, 2009, that sent Toronto's second-round pick in 2010 to Toronto in exchange for a third-round pick in 2011 and this pick.
Toronto previously acquired this pick as the result of a trade on July 27, 2009, that sent Anton Stralman, Colin Stuart and a seventh-round draft pick in 2012 to Calgary in exchange for Wayne Primeau and this pick.
 The New York Rangers' second round pick went to the Calgary Flames as the result of a trade on June 1, 2011, that sent Tim Erixon and a fifth-round pick in 2011 to New York in exchange for Roman Horak, Washington's second-round pick in 2011 and this pick.
 The Buffalo Sabres' second round pick went to the St. Louis Blues as the result of a trade on February 27, 2011, that sent Brad Boyes to Buffalo in exchange for this pick.
 The Montreal Canadiens' second-round pick went to the San Jose Sharks as the result of a trade on June 25, 2011, that sent San Jose's second-round pick in 2011 (59th overall) and third-round pick in 2012 to Florida in exchange for this pick.
Florida previously acquired the pick as the result of a trade on February 11, 2010, that sent Dominic Moore to Montreal in exchange for this pick.
 The Chicago Blackhawks' second-round pick went to the Detroit Red Wings as the result of a trade on June 24, 2011, that sent Detroit's first-round pick in 2011 (24th overall) to the Ottawa Senators in exchange for Ottawa's second-round pick in 2011 (#35 overall) and this pick.
Ottawa previously acquired the pick as the result of a trade on February 28, 2011, that sent Chris Campoli and a conditional seventh-round pick in 2012 to Chicago in exchange for Ryan Potulny and this pick (being conditional at the time of the trade). The condition – Chicago had until 48 hours before the start of the 2011 Entry Draft to determine if they send their own second-round pick or one of the picks acquired from Atlanta and Calgary to Ottawa – was converted on June 23, 2011.
 The Montreal Canadiens' compensatory second-round pick (50th overall) went to the New York Islanders as the result of a trade on December 28, 2010, that sent James Wisniewski to Montreal in exchange for a conditional fifth-round pick in 2012 or a fourth-round pick in 2013 if Montreal trades their 2012 fifth-round pick and this pick.
Montreal previously received the pick as compensation for not signing 2006 first-round pick David Fischer before August 15, 2010.
 The Philadelphia Flyers' second-round pick went to the Phoenix Coyotes as the result of a trade on March 4, 2009, that sent Daniel Carcillo to Philadelphia in exchange for Scottie Upshall and this pick.
 The Washington Capitals' second-round pick went to the Calgary Flames as the result of a trade on June 1, 2011, that sent Tim Erixon and Calgary's fifth-round pick in 2011 to New York in exchange for Roman Horak, New York's second-round pick in 2011 and this pick.
The Rangers previously acquired the pick as the result of a trade on June 26, 2010, that sent Bobby Sanguinetti to Carolina in exchange for Carolina's sixth-round pick in 2010 and this pick.
Carolina previously acquired the pick as the result of a trade on March 3, 2010, that sent Joe Corvo to Washington in exchange for Brian Pothier, Oskar Osala and this pick.
 The San Jose Sharks' second-round pick went to the Florida Panthers as the result of a trade on June 25, 2011, that sent Montreal's second-round pick in 2011 (47th overall) to San Jose in exchange for San Jose's third-round pick in 2012 and this pick.
 The Vancouver Canucks' second-round pick went to the Minnesota Wild as the result of a trade on June 25, 2011, that sent Minnesota's third and fourth-round picks in 2011 (71st and 101st overall) to Vancouver in exchange for this pick.
 The Boston Bruins' second-round pick went to the Ottawa Senators as the result of a trade on February 15, 2011, that sent Chris Kelly to Boston in exchange for this pick.

Round three

Notes
 The Colorado Avalanche's third-round pick went to the New York Islanders as the result of a trade on June 26, 2010, that sent a fourth-round pick in 2010 to Colorado in exchange for this pick.
 The New York Islanders' third-round pick went to the Anaheim Ducks as the result of a trade on July 30, 2010, that sent James Wisniewski to New York in exchange for this pick (being conditional at the time of the trade). The condition – New York had to choose to send either their own pick or the pick previously acquired from Colorado, until June 1, 2011 – was converted at an unknown date.
 The Ottawa Senators' third-round pick went to the Columbus Blue Jackets as the result of a trade on June 25, 2011, that sent Nikita Filatov to Ottawa in exchange for this pick.
 The Columbus Blue Jackets' third-round pick went to the Philadelphia Flyers as the result of a trade on June 23, 2011, that sent Jeff Carter to Columbus in exchange for Jakub Voracek, a first-round pick in 2011 and this pick.
 The New Jersey Devils' third-round pick was forfeited as the result of a penalty sanction due to cap circumvention when signing Ilya Kovalchuk. The penalty includes a fine of $3 million, a forfeiture of one first-round pick between 2011 and 2014 as determined by the Devils (forfeited in 2014), and this pick.
 The Toronto Maple Leafs' third-round pick went to the Chicago Blackhawks as the result of a trade on September 5, 2009, that sent Toronto's own second-round pick in 2010 back to Toronto in exchange for Calgary's second-round pick in 2011 and this pick.
 The Minnesota Wild's third-round pick went to the Vancouver Canucks as the result of a trade on June 25, 2011, that sent a second-round pick in 2011 (60th overall) to Minnesota in exchange for a fourth-round pick in 2011 (101st overall) and this pick.
 The St. Louis Blues' third-round pick went to the New York Rangers as the result of a trade on June 25, 2011, that sent Evgeny Grachyov to St. Louis in exchange for this pick.
 The Calgary Flames' third-round pick went to the Edmonton Oilers as the result of a trade on March 3, 2010, that sent Steve Staios to the Flames in exchange for Aaron Johnson and this pick (being conditional at the time of the trade). The condition – Calgary elects to transfer its own third-round pick in 2011 instead of 2010 – was converted on June 26, 2010, when Calgary retained their 2010 pick (73rd overall).
 The Dallas Stars' third-round pick went to the New Jersey Devils as the result of a trade on January 7, 2011, that sent Jamie Langenbrunner to Dallas in exchange for a conditional pick in 2012 and this pick (being conditional at the time of the trade). The condition – Dallas does not win a round of the 2011 Stanley Cup playoffs and does not re-sign Langenbrunner prior to the 2011 Draft – was converted on June 24, 2011.
 The New York Rangers' third-round pick went to the Florida Panthers as the result of a trade on February 26, 2011, that sent Bryan McCabe to New York in exchange for Tim Kennedy and this pick.
 The Montreal Canadiens' third-round pick went to the Winnipeg Jets as the result of a trade on June 25, 2011, that sent Winnipeg's and Montreal's own fourth-round picks in 2011 (97th and 108th overall) to Montreal in exchange for this pick.
 The Phoenix Coyotes' third-round pick went to the Boston Bruins as the result of a trade on March 3, 2010, that sent Derek Morris to Phoenix in exchange for this pick (being conditional at the time of the trade). The condition – Morris is re-signed by Phoenix for the 2010–11 season – was converted on July 1, 2010.
 The Nashville Predators' third-round pick went to the Los Angeles Kings as the result of a trade on June 25, 2011, that sent Los Angeles' sixth-round pick in 2011 (170th overall) and Toronto's third-round pick in 2012 to Nashville in exchange for this pick.
 The Pittsburgh Penguins' third-round pick went to the Phoenix Coyotes as the result of a trade on June 7, 2011, that sent Ilya Bryzgalov to Philadelphia in exchange for Matt Clackson, future considerations and this conditional pick. The condition – Philadelphia signs Bryzgalov before the start of the third round of the draft – was converted on June 23, 2011.
Philadelphia previously acquired the pick as the result of a trade on June 25, 2010, that sent Dan Hamhuis to Pittsburgh in exchange for this pick.
 The Philadelphia Flyers' third-round pick went to the Toronto Maple Leafs as the result of a trade on February 14, 2011, that sent Kris Versteeg to Philadelphia in exchange for a first-round pick in 2011 and this pick.
 The Washington Capitals' third-round pick went to the Florida Panthers as the result of a trade on February 28, 2011, that sent Dennis Wideman to Washington in exchange for Jake Hauswirth and this pick.
 The Tampa Bay Lightning's third-round pick went to the St. Louis Blues as a result of a trade on February 18, 2011, that sent Eric Brewer to Tampa Bay in exchange for Brock Beukeboom and this pick.
 The Boston Bruins' third-round pick went to the Florida Panthers as the result of a trade on June 22, 2010, that sent Nathan Horton and Gregory Campbell to Boston in exchange for Dennis Wideman, Boston's first-round pick in 2010 and this pick.

Round four

Notes
 The Florida Panthers' fourth-round pick went to the Nashville Predators as the result of a trade on August 5, 2010, that sent Mike Santorelli to Florida in exchange for this pick (being conditional at the time of the trade). The condition which upgraded the original fifth-round pick to this pick is unknown.
 The Winnipeg Jets' fourth-round pick went to the Montreal Canadiens as the result of a trade on June 25, 2011, that sent Montreal's third-round pick in 2011 (78th overall) to Winnipeg in exchange for Montreal's fourth-round pick in 2011 (108th overall) and this pick.
 The Minnesota Wild's fourth-round pick went to the Vancouver Canucks as the result of a trade on June 25, 2011, that sent Vancouver's second-round pick in 2011 (60th overall) to Minnesota in exchange for the Minnesota's third-round pick in 2011 (71st overall) and this pick.
 The Montreal Canadiens' fourth-round pick was re-acquired from the Winnipeg Jets as the result of a trade on June 25, 2011, that sent Montreal's third-round pick in 2011 (78th overall) to Winnipeg in exchange for Winnipeg's fourth-round pick in 2011 (97th overall) and this pick.
Winnipeg previously acquired the pick as the result of a trade on February 24, 2011, that sent Brent Sopel and Nigel Dawes from the Atlanta Thrashers to Montreal in exchange for Ben Maxwell and this pick.
 The Anaheim Ducks' fourth-round pick went to the Montreal Canadiens as the result of a trade on December 2, 2009, that sent Kyle Chipchura to Anaheim in exchange for this pick.
 The Pittsburgh Penguins' fourth-round pick went to the Edmonton Oilers as the result of a trade on January 17, 2009, that sent Mathieu Garon to Pittsburgh in exchange for Dany Sabourin, Ryan Stone and this pick.
 The Tampa Bay Lightning's fourth-round pick went to the Philadelphia Flyers as the result of a trade on July 19, 2010, that sent Simon Gagne to Tampa Bay in exchange for Matt Walker and this pick.
 The San Jose Sharks' fourth-round pick went to the Winnipeg Jets as the result of a trade on June 25, 2011, that sent Carolina's fifth-round pick and Calgary's seventh-round pick both in 2011 (133rd and 194th overall) to San Jose in exchange for this pick.

Round five

Notes
 The Winnipeg Jets' fifth-round pick went to the New York Islanders as the result of a trade on June 26, 2010, that sent the New York Islanders and New York Rangers' sixth-round picks in 2010 to the Atlanta Thrashers in exchange for this pick.
 The Carolina Hurricanes' fifth-round pick went to the San Jose Sharks as the result of a trade on June 25, 2011, that sent San Jose's fourth-round pick in 2011 (119th overall) to Winnipeg in exchange for Calgary's seventh-round pick in 2011 (194th overall) and this pick.
Winnipeg previously acquired the pick as the result of a trade on February 28, 2011, that sent Niclas Bergfors and Patrick Rissmiller from the Atlanta Thrashers to Florida in exchange for Radek Dvorak and this pick.
Florida previously acquired this pick as the result of a trade on February 24, 2011, that sent Cory Stillman to Carolina in exchange for Ryan Carter and this pick.
 The Calgary Flames' fifth-round pick went to the New York Rangers as the result of a trade on June 1, 2011, that sent Roman Horak and Washington and New York's second-round picks in 2011 to Calgary in exchange for Tim Erixon and this pick.
 The Philadelphia Flyers' fifth-round pick went to the Detroit Red Wings as the result of a trade on February 6, 2010, that sent Ville Leino to Philadelphia in exchange for Ole-Kristian Tollefsen and this pick.
 The San Jose Sharks' fifth-round pick went to the Winnipeg Jets as the result of a trade on January 18, 2011, that sent Ben Eager from the Atlanta Thrashers to San Jose in exchange for this pick.

Round six

Notes
 The Edmonton Oilers' sixth-round pick went to the Toronto Maple Leafs as the result of a trade on June 26, 2010, that sent Phoenix's seventh-round pick in 2010 to Edmonton in exchange for this pick.
 The New York Islanders' sixth-round pick went to the Phoenix Coyotes as the result of a trade on February 9, 2011, that sent Al Montoya to New York in exchange for this pick.
 The Toronto Maple Leafs' sixth-round pick went to the Anaheim Ducks as the result of a trade on June 25, 2011, that sent Anaheim's sixth-round pick in 2012 to Toronto in exchange for this pick.
 The New York Rangers' sixth-round pick went to the San Jose Sharks as the result of a trade on February 12, 2010, that sent Jody Shelley to New York in exchange for this pick (being conditional at the time of the trade). The condition – Shelley does not re-sign with New York prior to the 2010–11 season. – was converted on July 1, 2010, when the player was signed by the Philadelphia Flyers.
 The Los Angeles Kings' sixth-round pick went to the Nashville Predators as the result of a trade on June 25, 2011, that sent Nashville's third-round pick in 2011 (82nd overall) to Los Angeles in exchange for Toronto's third-round pick in 2012 and this pick.
 The Phoenix Coyotes' sixth-round pick went to the Ottawa Senators as the result of a trade on February 17, 2011, that sent Jarkko Ruutu to Anaheim in exchange for this pick.
Anaheim previously acquired the pick as the result of a trade on March 3, 2010, that sent Petteri Nokelainen to Phoenix in exchange for this pick.
 The Nashville Predators' sixth-round pick went to the New York Rangers as the result of a trade on June 25, 2011, that sent New York's sixth-round pick in 2012 to Nashville in exchange for this pick.
 The Anaheim Ducks' sixth-round pick went the Toronto Maple Leafs as the result of a trade on August 10, 2009, that sent Justin Pogge to Anaheim in exchange for this pick (being conditional at the time of the trade). The condition – Pogge starts less than 30 regular-season games for Anaheim, or another NHL team he is traded to by Anaheim, between the 2009–10 and 2010–11 seasons – was converted on February 5, 2011, when Carolina played their 52nd game of the 2010–11 season without using Pogge in one of them (as Pogge had not started a game for any NHL team during the 2009–10 season).

Round seven

Notes
 The Calgary Flames' seventh-round pick went to the San Jose Sharks as the result of a trade on June 25, 2011, that sent San Jose's fourth-round pick in 2011 (119th overall) to the Winnipeg in exchange for Carolina's fifth-round pick in 2011 (133rd overall) and this pick.
Winnipeg previously acquired the pick as the result of a trade on February 28, 2011, that sent Fredrik Modin from the Atlanta Thrashers to Calgary in exchange for this pick.
 The New York Rangers' seventh-round pick went to the Phoenix Coyotes as the result of a March 3, 2010, trade that sent Anders Eriksson to the Rangers in exchange for Miika Wiikman and this pick.
 The Phoenix Coyotes' seventh-round pick went to the Tampa Bay Lightning as the result of a trade on June 25, 2011, that sent Marc-Antoine Pouliot to Phoenix in exchange for this pick.
 The Anaheim Ducks' seventh-round pick went to the Toronto Maple Leafs as the result of a March 3, 2010, trade that sent Joey MacDonald to the Ducks in exchange for this pick.
 The Pittsburgh Penguins' seventh-round pick went to the Ottawa Senators as the result of a February 24, 2011, trade that sent Alexei Kovalev to the Penguins in exchange for this pick (being conditional at the time of the trade). The condition – Pittsburgh does not advance to the 2011 Eastern Conference semifinals – was converted on April 27, 2011.
 The San Jose Sharks' seventh-round pick went to the Pittsburgh Penguins as the result of a trade on June 26, 2010, that sent Pittsburgh's seventh-round pick in 2010 to San Jose in exchange for this pick.
 The Boston Bruins' seventh-round pick went to the Chicago Blackhawks as the result of a trade on June 26, 2010, that sent Chicago's seventh-round pick in 2010 to Boston in exchange for this pick.

Draftees based on nationality

North American draftees by state/province

See also 
 List of NHL first overall draft choices

References

External links 
2011 NHL Entry Draft player stats at The Internet Hockey Database

2011
2011 in sports in Minnesota
Draft
National Hockey League in Minneapolis–Saint Paul